The East Coast Conference was an college athletic conference at the Division I of the National Collegiate Athletic Association (NCAA). It was founded as the university division of the Middle Atlantic Conferences (MAC) in 1958. The MAC consisted of over 30 teams at that time, making it impossible to organize full league schedules in sports like football, basketball, and baseball. In 1958, the larger schools created their own mini-conference, consisting of 11 members (7 for football).

In 1974, the larger schools in the MAC officially formed the East Coast Conference. During the 1974-75 through 1981-82 seasons, the ECC enjoyed a consistent membership of 12 teams. That stability was rocked when St. Joseph's, Temple, and West Chester departed in the summer of 1982, while Towson was added, trimming the league to 10 programs. Over the next two years, La Salle and American also said goodbye, cutting the roster to eight.

In 1987, A duo of East Carolina pitched a make-over for the ECC, It included adding 12 members and sponsoring Football again, The schools that were to be added included the return of Rutgers and Temple as well as adding Boston College, Syracuse, Pitt, Penn State, West Virginia, Virginia Tech, ECU, South Carolina, Miami and Florida State. The NCAA approved it and was Scheduled to start in 1990 and struck a TV deal with NBC, The conference’s basketball tournament was going to move to the Meadowlands Arena, after they couldn’t get Madison Square Garden to host because the were in contact with the Big East. The Conference was abandoned on March 18, 1990 after Penn State announced that it would be joining the Big Ten Conference, after that Florida State joined the ACC, South Carolina left for the SEC and Boston College, Syracuse, Pitt, Temple, Rutgers, West Virginia, Virginia Tech, and Miami all formed Big East Football and NBC got the Notre Dame football rights. 

The winds of realignment would sweep across intercollegiate athletics in full force as the next decade dawned. Bucknell, Lafayette, and Lehigh left to help form the Patriot League in 1990, while Delaware and Drexel headed to the North Atlantic Conference (now known as the America East Conference) in 1991. Attempting to stem the tide, the ECC added UMBC and Central Connecticut in 1990, followed by Division I newcomers Buffalo and Brooklyn in 1991.

More erosion ensued as Rider, Towson, and UMBC moved to other leagues after the 1991–92 campaign, while Brooklyn suspended its entire athletic department. This reduced the ECC to just 3 members -- Hofstra, Central Connecticut, and Buffalo—not enough to maintain official conference status under NCAA bylaws during the 1992–93 season. Unable to move elsewhere themselves, that trio made one last salvage effort.

Spreading far and wide, Chicago State, Northeastern Illinois, and Troy State were enlisted, doubling participation to 6 teams for the 1993–94 academic year. Finally, the ECC was absorbed by the Mid-Continent Conference (now The Summit League) in the summer of 1994, although Hofstra instead decided to join the North Atlantic Conference. None of the 5 ECC institutions which entered the Mid-Con at that time remain in the league today.

According to the MAC's website, the East Coast Conference was not a successor to the MAC. Instead, 11 of the 12 University Division members left to form the original ECC in 1974, but the primary organization continued as an NCAA Division III conference when the NCAA adopted a division structure.

"June 4–6, 1974 - The first major schism to be focused on this study occurs when the MAC University Division, with 12 members, loses 11 members, who leave to form their own conference (East Coast Conference). American, Bucknell, Delaware, Drexel, Lafayette, La Salle, Lehigh, Rider, St. Joseph's, Temple and West Chester all leave. Gettysburg, which opts to join the College Division, is the only University Division institution to remain."

Member schools
In all tables in this section, school names and nicknames reflect those in use in the last school year each institution was an ECC member. Conference names in the "Next Conference" columns reflect those in use during the first school year of membership in the new league.

Founding members

Notes

Subsequent members

Notes

Membership timeline

Champions

Men's basketball

Regular season
 1959 St. Joseph’s
 1960 St. Joseph’s
 1961 St. Joseph’s
 1962 St. Joseph’s
 1963 St. Joseph’s
 1964 Temple
 1965 St. Joseph’s
 1966 St. Joseph’s
 1967 Temple
 1968 La Salle
 1969 Temple
 1970 St. Joseph’s (East) / Rider (West) / Lehigh (West) / Lafayette (West)
 1971 St. Joseph’s (East) / Lafayette (West)
 1972 Temple (East) / Rider (West)
 1973 St. Joseph’s (East) / Lafayette (West)
 1974 St. Joseph’s (East) / La Salle (East) / Rider (West)
 1975 American (East) / La Salle (East) / Lafayette (West)
 1976 St. Joseph’s (East) / Lafayette (West)
 1977 Temple (East) / Hofstra (East) / Lafayette (West)
 1978 La Salle (East) / Lafayette (West)
 1979 Temple (East) / Bucknell (West)
 1980 St. Joseph’s (East) / Lafayette (West)
 1981 American (East) / Lafayette (West) / Rider (West)
 1982 Temple (East) / West Chester (West)
 1983 American (East) / La Salle (East) / Hofstra (East) / Rider (West)
 1984 Bucknell
 1985 Bucknell
 1986 Drexel
 1987 Bucknell
 1988 Lafayette
 1989 Bucknell
 1990 Towson/Hofstra/Lehigh
 1991 Towson
 1992 Hofstra
 1993 No Championship 
 1994 Troy State

Conference tournament
 1975 La Salle
 1976 Hofstra
 1977 Hofstra
 1978 La Salle
 1979 Temple
 1980 La Salle
 1981 St. Joseph’s
 1982 St. Joseph’s
 1983 La Salle
 1984 Rider
 1985 Lehigh
 1986 Drexel
 1987 Bucknell
 1988 Lehigh
 1989 Bucknell
 1990 Towson
 1991 Towson
 1992 Towson
 1993 DNP
 1994 Hofstra

References

 http://www.ncaapublications.com/productdownloads/BK07.pdf
 http://www.sports-reference.com/cbb/conferences/AMSO/

 
Sports in the Eastern United States
Defunct NCAA Division I conferences
1958 establishments in the United States
1994 disestablishments in the United States
Sports leagues established in 1958
Sports leagues disestablished in 1994
Articles which contain graphical timelines